El Pedroso is a city located in the province of Seville, Spain. According to the 2005 census (INE), the city has a population of 2291 inhabitants.

References

External links
El Pedroso - Sistema de Información Multiterritorial de Andalucía

Municipalities of the Province of Seville